Nolina parryi (Parry's beargrass, Parry nolina, or giant nolina) is a flowering plant that is native to Baja California, southern California and Arizona.

Description
It can exceed  in height, its inflorescence reaching .

Distribution and habitat

Uses
Native Americans consumed the young stems and wove the leaves into baskets.

References

Further reading
Stewart, Jon Mark (1998), Mojave Desert Wildflowers, p. 7.

External links

 Calflora Database: Nolina parryi (Parry's beargrass,  Parry's nolina)
USDA Plants Profile for Nolina parryi (Parry's beargrass)
UC CalPhotos gallery

parryi
Flora of California
Flora of Arizona
Flora of Baja California
North American desert flora
Flora of the California desert regions
Natural history of the California chaparral and woodlands
Natural history of the Mojave Desert
Natural history of the Peninsular Ranges
Plants described in 1879
Taxa named by Sereno Watson
Flora without expected TNC conservation status